Phlaocyon latidens is an extinct species of the genus Phlaocyon, belonging to the subfamily Borophaginae and tribe Phlaocyonini, a canid which inhabited northwestern North America from the Late Oligocene to Miocene living 33.3–20.6 mya and existed for approximately .

Taxonomy

Morphology

Body mass
 estimated the body mass of two specimens to be .

Fossil distribution
North Blue Basin Site, John Day Formation, Grant County, Oregon ~33.3–30.8 Ma.
Foree Site, John Day Formation, Wheeler County, Oregon ~30.8–20.6 Ma.

References

Notes

Sources

 
 Martin, L.D. 1989. Fossil history of the terrestrial carnivora. Pages 536 - 568 in J.L. Gittleman, editor. Carnivore Behavior, Ecology, and Evolution, Vol. 1. Comstock Publishing Associates: Ithaca.
 
 
 
 
 
 

Borophagines
Oligocene canids
Miocene canids
Aquitanian species extinctions
Oligocene species first appearances
Taxa named by Edward Drinker Cope